Robert Stauch (September 25, 1898 – May 1, 1981) was a German politician of the Christian Democratic Union (CDU) and former member of the German Bundestag.

Life 
In the post-war period, Stauch belonged to the German Bundestag as a CDU member from its first election in 1949 to 1965. He represented the constituency of Westerburg in parliament as a member of parliament who was always directly elected. In addition, he was mayor of Katzenelnbogen for many years.

Literature

References

1898 births
1981 deaths
Members of the Bundestag for Rhineland-Palatinate
Members of the Bundestag 1961–1965
Members of the Bundestag 1957–1961
Members of the Bundestag 1953–1957
Members of the Bundestag 1949–1953
Members of the Bundestag for the Christian Democratic Union of Germany